Schliessler is a surname. Notable people with the surname include:

 Martin Schliessler (1929–2008), German adventurer, cinematographer, and sculptor
 Tobias A. Schliessler (born 1958), German cinematographer